Hypsilurus spinosus is a species of agama found in Indonesia.

References

Hypsilurus
Reptiles described in 1851
Taxa named by André Marie Constant Duméril
Taxa named by Gabriel Bibron
Agamid lizards of New Guinea